Diarsia flavostigma is a moth of the family Noctuidae. It is endemic to Borneo and possibly Sumatra.

External links
 Species info

Diarsia
Moths described in 1976